Chenaran (also Romanized as Chenārān; also known as Chenār) is a village in Giyan Rural District, Giyan District, Nahavand County, Hamadan Province, Iran. At the 2006 census, its population was 163, in 43 families.

References 

Populated places in Nahavand County